Iwan Dimov (Bulgarian:Иван Димов; born ) is a Bulgarian weightlifter. He won the gold medal in the men's 61 kg event at the 2022 European Weightlifting Championships held in Tirana, Albania.

Major results

References

Living people
2002 births
Bulgarian male weightlifters
European Weightlifting Championships medalists
21st-century Bulgarian people